Hassi El Ferid is a town and commune in the Kasserine Governorate, Tunisia. As of 2004 it had a population of 4 711. It is 35 km from Kasserine and 75 from Gafsa.

See also
List of cities in Tunisia

References

Populated places in Tunisia
Communes of Tunisia